Saat Number Kayedi (Prisoner Number Seven) is a Bengali drama film directed by Sukumar Dasgupta based on the same name story of Diptendra Sanyal. This film was released on 7 February 1953 under the banner of S. M. Productions. This was first official debut film of Suchitra Sen.

Cast
 Suchitra Sen
 Chhabi Biswas
 Kamal Mitra
Molina Devi
 Bhanu Banerjee
 Jahar Ganguly
 Shyam Laha
 Samar Roy
 Kanu Bandopadhyay
 Mihir Bhattacharya
 Probha Debi
 Bijoy Bose

External links

References

Bengali-language Indian films
1953 films
Indian drama films
1953 drama films
Films based on Indian novels
Indian black-and-white films
1950s Bengali-language films